Saint-Marcan is a commune in the Ille-et-Vilaine department in Brittany in northwestern France.

Population
Inhabitants of Saint-Marcan are called marcanais in French.

Sights
 Menhir
 Medieval Christian Cross
 Chappe Tower

See also
Communes of the Ille-et-Vilaine department

Saint Marcin in Ireland
In the heart of the Rosclave Channel in west County Mayo in the Republic of Ireland were the visible the remains of St. Marcin's Castle, Church, outdoor altar and a burial ground. However, it appears little remains of these features other than on historical maps. *

References

External links

Mayors of Ille-et-Vilaine Association 

Communes of Ille-et-Vilaine